Lost in Munich is a 2015 Czech comedy film directed by Petr Zelenka. The movie plot and title is inspired by Lost in La Mancha, a documentary film about Terry Gilliam's unfinished movie.

The narrative revolves a haunted making of the movie Lost in Munich which tells the story about unsuccessful journalist and 90-year-old parrot who used to live with the French prime minister Édouard Daladier and is still repeating Daladier's quotes related to the Munich Agreement. The failed film production (with the feigned French co-production) is the allegory to the alleged French betrayal in 1938.

The film received the Czech Film Critics' Awards for Best Film, Director and Screenplay. It was selected as the Czech entry for the Best Foreign Language Film at the 89th Academy Awards but it was not nominated.

Cast
 Martin Myšička as journalist Pavel Liehm, as himself
 Marek Taclík as journalist Jakub, as himself
 Jana Plodková as secretary of the French Institute, as herself 
 Václav Kopta as editor in chief
 Václav Neužil as husband of actress Plodková
 Tomáš Bambušek as film director Tomáš 
 Vladimír Škultéty as producent Vladimír
 Jiří Rendl as the assistant director Adam
 Jitka Schneiderová as Pavel's wife Dana, as herself
 Stanislas Pierret as director of French Institute, as actor Gérard Pierret
 Marcial Di Fonzo Bo as parrot assistant/assistant director Jean Dupont

Reception
Stephen Dalton of The Hollywood Reporter wrote:
Paying explicit homage to Francois Truffaut's classic behind-the-scenes film-set comedy Day for Night, Zelenka's mischievous mix of farce and tragedy is a much smarter animal than it first appears. Behind its zany premise and sometimes bumpy tone, Lost in Munich eventually emerges as a sardonic commentary on the Czech people's simplistic self-image as eternal victims of more powerful European neighbors. ... Lost in Munich is unlikely to take much business from Judd Apatow in the multiplex laughter league, but it is both entertaining and educational, a largely successful experiment in navel-gazing meta-comedy.

See also
 List of submissions to the 89th Academy Awards for Best Foreign Language Film
 List of Czech submissions for the Academy Award for Best Foreign Language Film

References

External links
 

2015 films
Czech comedy films
2010s Czech-language films
Films about filmmaking
Films directed by Petr Zelenka
Films set in Prague
Czech Lion Awards winners (films)
Czech Film Critics' Awards winners
2015 comedy films